Klaus Toppmöller (born 12 August 1951) is a German football manager and former professional player.

Playing career
A forward, Toppmöller scored 108 Bundesliga goals for 1. FC Kaiserslautern in 204 matches in the West German top flight. He earned three caps and scored one goal during his international career for West Germany.

Coaching career
Toppmöller became coach of FSV Salmrohr from summer 1987 to 18 April 1988 when he became coach of SSV Ulm 1846 until February 1989. After his dismissal, Toppmöller coached East German second division side FC Erzgebirge Aue from 28 November 1990 to 30 June 1991. He then transferred back to the Federal league with SV Waldhof Mannheim from 19 September 1991 to 30 June 1993.

In light of his success, Toppmöller became coach of Eintracht Frankfurt, with whom he had a very successful start. But after failures with the squad relationship and resultantly missing the championship, he was dismissed on 10 April 1994. Toppmöller then joined VfL Bochum on 9 November 1994, with whom in the 1997–98 season reached the last sixteen of the UEFA Cup. On 30 June 1999, Toppmöller left his position as coach of VfL Bochum to become coach of 1. FC Saarbrücken, but was eventually dismissed there on 29 November 2000.

From 1 July 2001, Toppmöller was coach with Bayer 04 Leverkusen, whom in his first season led to the UEFA Champions League final, as well as second place in Bundesliga and the DFB-Pokal final. Toppmöller was eventually declared by German sports journalists as "football coach of the year" for 2002. However, in the following season Leverkusen performed poorly, and in light of a poor league position which could have led to relegation, Toppmöller was sacked on 16 February 2003.

Toppmöller became coach of Hamburger SV on 23 October 2003. However, after the team fell to last place in the league, mostly because of his unusual tactics, formations and usage of out of position players (such as midfielder Sergej Barbarez in defence), he was sacked on 17 October 2004.

On 1 February 2006, Toppmöller became national coach of the Georgia national football team, with Ralf Minge as assistant coach. He was dismissed on 1 April 2008.

Personal life
Toppmöller married Rosi in 1977, with whom he had Sarah-Nina, Dino (coached him at Saarbrücken) and Tommy. His brother Heinz (played together at Kaiserslautern) and nephew Marco also became footballers.

Career statistics

Honours

As a manager
Bayer Leverkusen
 UEFA Champions League runner-up: 2001–02
 DFB-Pokal runner-up: 2001–02

Individual
German Football Manager of the Year: 2002

References

External links
 NASL career stats
 
 

Living people
1951 births
Association football forwards
German footballers
Germany international footballers
Germany B international footballers
SV Eintracht Trier 05 players
1. FC Kaiserslautern players
North American Soccer League (1968–1984) players
Dallas Tornado players
Calgary Boomers players
FSV Salmrohr players
German football managers
Eintracht Frankfurt managers
1. FC Saarbrücken managers
VfL Bochum managers
Bayer 04 Leverkusen managers
Hamburger SV managers
Bundesliga players
Bundesliga managers
2. Bundesliga managers
Georgia national football team managers
FC Erzgebirge Aue managers
Expatriate football managers in Georgia (country)
German expatriate football managers
German expatriate sportspeople in Georgia (country)
West German footballers
West German football managers
West German expatriate footballers
West German expatriate sportspeople in Canada
West German expatriate sportspeople in the United States
Expatriate soccer players in the United States
Expatriate soccer players in Canada